The 2020 Lucas Oil 150 was the 23rd and final stock car race of the 2020 NASCAR Gander RV & Outdoors Truck Series season, the 26th iteration of the event, and the championship race that decided the champion of that year's season. The race was held on Friday, November 6, 2020 in Avondale, Arizona at Phoenix Raceway, a  permanent low-banked tri-oval race track. The race was extended from the scheduled 150 laps to 156 due to a NASCAR overtime finish. After a spin from Dawson Cram would set up an overtime finish, Sheldon Creed would decide to stay out to take the lead. He would manage to hold on and defend the lead en route to his first NASCAR Gander RV & Outdoors Truck Series championship, and the 5th of his career and of the season. To fill out the podium, Zane Smith of GMS Racing and Chandler Smith of Kyle Busch Motorsports finished 2nd and 3rd, respectively.

The final standings for the Championship 4 from 1st-4th would stand as Sheldon Creed, Zane Smith, Brett Moffitt, and Grant Enfinger.

Background 

Phoenix Raceway – also known as PIR – is a one-mile, low-banked tri-oval race track located in Avondale, Arizona. It is named after the nearby metropolitan area of Phoenix. The motorsport track opened in 1964 and currently hosts two NASCAR race weekends annually. PIR has also hosted the IndyCar Series, CART, USAC and the Rolex Sports Car Series. The raceway is currently owned and operated by International Speedway Corporation.

The raceway was originally constructed with a 2.5 mi (4.0 km) road course that ran both inside and outside of the main tri-oval. In 1991 the track was reconfigured with the current 1.51 mi (2.43 km) interior layout. PIR has an estimated grandstand seating capacity of around 67,000. Lights were installed around the track in 2004 following the addition of a second annual NASCAR race weekend.

Phoenix Raceway is home to two annual NASCAR race weekends, one of 13 facilities on the NASCAR schedule to host more than one race weekend a year. The track is both the first and last stop in the western United States, as well as the fourth and the last track on the schedule.

This was the first time the championship race was held in Phoenix.

Championship 4 drivers 
Grant Enfinger: Made it to the Championship 4 after winning a wild race at the 2020 NASCAR Hall of Fame 200.

Sheldon Creed: Made it to the Championship 4 after dominating and winning the 2020 SpeedyCash.com 400.

Zane Smith: Made it to the Championship 4 based on having the most owner points out of the 5 non-winners from the Round of 8.

Brett Moffitt: Made it to the Championship 4 after winning the 2020 Clean Harbors 200.

Entry list

Starting lineup 
The starting lineup was determined by a metric qualifying system  based on the results and fastest lap of the last race, the 2020 NASCAR Hall of Fame 200 and owner's points. As a result, Grant Enfinger of ThorSport Racing won the pole.

Race results 

 Note: Sheldon Creed, Grant Enfinger, Brett Moffitt, and Zane Smith are not eligible for stage points because of their participation in the Championship 4.

Stage 1 Laps: 45

Stage 2 Laps: 45

Stage 3 Laps: 66

References 

2020 NASCAR Gander RV & Outdoors Truck Series
NASCAR races at Phoenix Raceway
November 2020 sports events in the United States
2020 in sports in Arizona